Thomas Edward Gilbert Sr. (January 15, 1940 – November 26, 2015) was an American professional wrestler. He wrestled for Continental Wrestling Association and throughout the South as Tommy Gilbert. He was the father of wrestlers Doug Gilbert and Eddie Gilbert.

Professional wrestling career
Tommy Gilbert made his debut in 1969, wrestling for promoter Nick Gulas. In March 1975, after wrestling primarily throughout Tennessee for nearly six years, he began going to other territories like Atlanta, Amarillo, the Canadian Maritimes, Florida, Kansas City, the Mid-South, Memphis, Puerto Rico, and the Mid-Atlantic areas.

Retirement
After retiring from active competition in 1984, he became a referee for Mid-South/UWF, until its buyout by Jim Crockett Promotions in 1987.

Tommy Gilbert was inducted into the Memphis Wrestling Hall of Fame at a USWA show in the Mid-South Coliseum on March 7, 1994, alongside Al Greene, Don Greene, Jerry Jarrett, Lance Russell and Sputnik Monroe.

Tommy later wrestled in Memphis as Freddy Krueger in the late 1980s.

Personal life
Gilbert was the father of two sons: Thomas Jr. and Doug Gilbert and a daughter Kim Gilbert Peters. The sons would become professional wrestlers as Hot Stuff Eddie Gilbert and Dangerous Doug Gilbert. Gilbert died on November 26, 2015, at the age of 75.

Championships and accomplishments
Cauliflower Alley Club
Family Award (2011) – with Eddie Gilbert and Doug Gilbert
Championship Wrestling from Florida
 NWA Florida Television Championship (1 time)
Memphis Wrestling Hall of Fame
Class of 2017
NWA Mid-America
NWA Southern Heavyweight Championship (1 time)
NWA Southern Junior Heavyweight Championship (4 times)
NWA Southern Tag Team Championship (7 times) – with Eddie Marlin (2), Bearcat Brown (2), Ricky Gibson (1), Eddie Gilbert (2)
NWA World Six-Man Tag Team Championship (2 times) - with Eddie Marlin and Ricky Gibson (1), Gorgeus George, Jr. and Paul Orndorff (1)
NWA Mid-America Tag Team Championship (2 times) - with Eddie Marlin (1) and Tojo Yamamoto (1)
Eastern Sports Association
North American Heavyweight Championship (2 times)
Gulf Coast Championship Wrestling/Southeastern Championship Wrestling
NWA Southeastern United States Junior Heavyweight Championship (2 times)
NWA Tennessee Tag Team Championship (4 times) - with Sputnik Monroe (2), Bearcat Brown (1) and Ron Wright (1)
United States Wrestling Association
Memphis Wrestling Hall of Fame (Class of 1994)
Western States Sports
NWA Western States Tag Team Championship (1 times) - with Scott Casey
World Wrestling Council/Capitol Sports Promotions
WWC Caribbean Heavyweight Championship (1 time)
NWA North American Tag Team Championship (Puerto Rico/WWC version) (1 time) - with Eddie Gilbert (1)

References

External links
 Memphis Wrestling History
 Online World of Wrestling profile

American male professional wrestlers
1940 births
2015 deaths
People from Lexington, Tennessee
20th-century professional wrestlers
Professional wrestling referees
NWA Florida Television Champions